Clarence Ian McCann (28 August 1933 – 16 February 2018) was an Australian rules footballer who played for the Hawthorn Football Club in the Victorian Football League (VFL). Ian coached the Commonwealth Bank Football Club for two seasons in the VAFA's section B. Ian was a member of Northern Golf Club, A Hall of Fame inductee at Pascoe Vale Central Cricket Club, a Broadmeadows Rotarian, a member of Commonwealth Bank Retired Officers Association, and lead vocalist in the trio The Hat Band performers at the British Isles Dance Club Brunswick for 25 years. Ian served in the Army as a conscript.

Notes

External links 

 Hawthorn Football Club: Player War Service: National Service 1951-1972: Clarence Ian McCann - ARMY.

1933 births
2018 deaths
Australian rules footballers from Victoria (Australia)
Hawthorn Football Club players
Maryborough Football Club players